Electronic court filing (ECF), or e-filing, is the automated transmission of legal documents from an attorney, party, or self-represented litigant to a court, from a court to an attorney, and from an attorney or other user to another attorney or other user of legal documents.

Technical standards 
The LegalXML Electronic Court Filing Technical Committee, a subcommittee of OASIS, with members representing both public and private sector organizations, has developed technical specifications that provide for standardization of the following for electronic filing of court documents:
 Message Structures
 Metadata

These XML-based standards support the implementation of electronic court filing but they do not define court policies. In 2003, the National Center for State Courts (NCSC) published Standards for Electronic Filing Processes (Technical and Business Approaches).

In the summer of 2009, the NCSC commenced a survey of the usage of e-filing in state courts across the country, including U.S. Territories. The survey responses were published in the 2009 NCSC Court E-filing Survey.

Release history 
 LegalXML:
 ECF 1.0: March 22, 2000
 ECF 1.1: July 7, 2002
 ECF 3.0: November 11, 2005
 ECF 3.01: April 25, 2006
 ECF 3.1: December 4, 2007
 ECF 4.0: October 8, 2008

LegalXML 
 Collaboration on nonproprietary standards for the legal community
 Merged with OASIS in March 2002.

ECF 1.0

ECF 1.1 
This version was approved by the NCSC Joint Technology Committee as a recommended standard in 2002.

ECF 2.0 
This version number was skipped in order to create a linkage between GJXDM 3.0.

ECF 3.0 
 Leverage new and emerging standards
 Volcabularies
 GJXDM
 UBL
 Web services
 W3C
 OASIS
 WS-I
 Use of XML schemas rather than DTD
 Supports Standards for Electronic Filing Processes (Technical and Business Approaches) approved in 2003.

ECF 4.0 
 Conforms with NIEM

Implementation assistance 

In an effort to promote implementation of the ECF 4.0 specification, the OASIS LegalXML ECF committee developed a "quick start guide", the 7 Steps to Electronic Filing with Electronic Court Filing 4.0. The guide provides information on the following topics:
 Standardize integration methods in an e-filing implementation with XML
 Integrate with any potential e-filing service provider or share e-filing data between systems or partners
 Set up a single method of processing data related to e-filing
 Find out how to implement legal service in an e-filing application

The LegalXML Electronic Court Filing Technical Committee serves as the primary source of documentation and support.

See also
 OASIS
 LegalXML
 GJXDM, the Global Justice XML Data Model
 National Information Exchange Model (NIEM)
 Electronic Filing System (Singapore)
 National Center for State Courts

References 

Legal documents